Nicodemus the Hagiorite or Nicodemus of the Holy Mountain (1749 – July 14, 1809) is a saint of the Eastern Orthodox Church.  He was an ascetic monk, mystic, theologian, and philosopher. His life's work was a revival of traditional Christian practices and patristic literature.

He wrote ascetic prayer literature and influenced the rediscovery of hesychasm, a method of contemplative prayer from the Byzantine period. He is most famous for his work with Macarius of Corinth on the anthology of monastic spiritual writings known as The Philokalia, as well as for his compilation of canons known as the Pedalion (or The Rudder) which he co-wrote with a hieromonk named Agapios Monachos.   With Macarios of Corinth, Nicodemus was responsible for the compilation and publishing of The Evergetinos, thoroughly reviewing a vast collection of materials from a number of other collections of sayings of monastics and others, ranging from the well-known works of St. John Cassian and Palladius, to the anonymously produced Apophthegmata collections, but including materials also from hagiographies, menologia, and other, unspecified and now-lost sources. Assembling, collecting, and editing a number of manuscripts scattered among the libraries of Mount Athos, the Holy Mountain. Nicodemus was canonized by the Ecumenical Patriarch of Constantinople in 1955.

Early life and education
Nicodemus was born Nicholas Kallivroutsis (Νικόλαος Καλλιβρούτσης) in 1749 on the Greek island of Naxos, which was at the time part of the Ottoman Empire.  According to his biographer, he was possessed of "great acuteness of mind, accurate perception, intellectual brightness, and vast memory", qualities which were readily apparent to those who furthered him along in his learning.

He passed from the tutelage of his parish priest to that of Archimandrite Chrysanthos, who was the brother of Cosmas. From there he made his way to Smyrna (now Izmir, Turkey), where he studied at the Evangelical School. Here he studied theology, as well as ancient Greek, Latin, French, and Italian.

Persecution from the Turks, who ruled most of the Greek world at the time, cut his schooling short, and he returned to Naxos in 1770.

He studied at Smyrna but was forced to abandon his studies during a time of Ottoman persecution. Instead he entered the Dionysiou monastery on Mount Athos in 1775.

Monastic life
Nicholas made the acquaintance of Macarius of Corinth a few years after returning home, beginning a lifelong friendship. It was shortly thereafter that he decided to embrace the monastic life, following the example of three monks he had encountered, Gregory, Niphon, and Arsenios. These men had come from Mount Athos, which had been an important center of monasticism for over seven hundred years, and persuaded Nicholas to go there as well. He arrived there in 1775, at age 26.

Upon being tonsured a monk, Nicholas' name was changed, as is the custom for those who had abandoned the world, to Nicodemus. He was initiated into the practice of hesychia, a method of prayer involving inner stillness, controlled breathing, and repetition of the "Jesus Prayer" (Lord Jesus Christ, Son of God, have mercy on me, a sinner). Nicodemus aligned himself with the monks known as Kollyvades, who sought a revival of traditional Orthodox practices and patristic literature, and he spent the remainder of his life at work translating and publishing those works. He also composed many original books of his own.

He died on July 14, 1809 on Mount Athos and was canonized by the Church of Greece on May 31, 1955. His feast day is 14 July.

Major works
In cooperation with Macarius of Corinth, Nicodemus compiled the Philokalia, which became an important work on monastic spirituality.  It contains some of the teachings of many of the ancient Desert Fathers.

Nicodemus also published modern editions of other theological writings, such as those of Symeon the New Theologian and Gregory Palamas. In addition, he wrote original works, such as the Pedalion (also known as The Rudder), a treatise on Eastern Orthodox canon law, and the Exomologetarion, a guide for confessors.

Another of his famous works is the Enchiridion of Counsels (or "Handbook of Spiritual Counsel"), written by Nicodemus at the suggestion of his cousin Hierotheos, who had recently been made Bishop of Euripos. This handbook on the religious life, aimed at clergy and lay Christians alike, continues to be influential on Greek spirituality to this day.  The work has been described as a theological-ethical tract that displays both deep psychological insight and a keen scientific mind.

He was not ignorant of the Western spiritual writers, and even published reworked versions of the Spiritual Exercises (Πνευματικά γυμνάσματα) of Ignatius of Loyola and The Spiritual Combat (βιβλίον καλούμενον· Αόρατος Πόλεμος) of Lorenzo Scupoli.

Beauty shall save the world

The term Philokalia (φιλοκαλία) (love of the good), used for the texts, aims to enshrine the history of the Jesus Prayer (the Prayer of the heart), and the spiritual practice of this, called Hesychasm. It is this love of beauty that revives and gives faith to the hopeless. The history of the prayer begins with the earliest fathers including Anthony the Great, and the text ends with Gregory Palamas. The title conveys the contemplative tradition, in that it teaches understanding of the inner or mystical Kingdom of God within each person. The spirit of God is an ember and one must cultivate the ember into an open fire. This perpetual fire burns in the heart, in love for all things, which is to share in the energy of God, which is love. It is within the Philokalia that one learns how to properly navigate the passions and depravity of existence called the World. The object of contemplation is "the love of beauty" or infinite beauty, which is God. For if existence were truly evil it could neither contain nor express beauty. This expression conveys the truth about the divine (ascetic) life and purpose which the heart learns through practice of the Prayer of the Heart, called Hesychasm. God in his energies is love. God is also the source of all that is truly beautiful, resplendent with divine glory. It is this beauty, the Russian philosophers held, that "will save the World".

See also
Theosis
Theoria
Ritual purification
Praxis
Sacred Heart as a Catholic doctrine.
Peter of Damascus

Sources
innerlightproductions (accessed Feb 17, 2007)
Catholic Forum(accessed Feb 17, 2007)
OrthodoxWiki

References

1749 births
1809 deaths
18th-century Greek people
19th-century Christian saints
Athonite Fathers
Greek theologians
People from Naxos
Saints of Ottoman Greece
Hesychasts
18th-century Christian monks
19th-century Christian monks
Eastern Orthodox saints
Translators to Greek
Hagiographers
Greek saints of the Eastern Orthodox Church
18th-century translators
18th-century Greek philosophers
19th-century Greek philosophers
Canon law of the Eastern Orthodox Church
Philokalia
People associated with Dionysiou Monastery